Massimiliano Eroli (born 4 December 1976 in Rome) is an Italian former butterfly and medley swimmer who competed in the 2000 Summer Olympics.

References

External links
 
 
 
 
 

1976 births
Living people
Swimmers from Rome
Italian male medley swimmers
Italian male butterfly swimmers
Olympic swimmers of Italy
Swimmers at the 2000 Summer Olympics
Mediterranean Games gold medalists for Italy
Competitors at the 1997 Mediterranean Games
World Games silver medalists
Mediterranean Games medalists in swimming
Swimmers of Centro Sportivo Carabinieri
Italian male lifesaving athletes
Lifesaving athletes of Centro Sportivo Carabinieri
20th-century Italian people
21st-century Italian people